Docklands Studios Melbourne is a major film and television production complex located in Melbourne’s redeveloped Docklands precinct. The complex opened in 2004 and its primary function is to support Victoria's film and television industry and attract international and Australian productions to Melbourne. It is one of three major studios in Australia, the others being Village Roadshow Studios on the Gold Coast and Disney Studios Australia in Sydney. The facility has recently expanded, with completion in early 2022 of a new super stage (Stage 6) that is one of the largest in the Southern Hemisphere.

Background

The push for Melbourne to build a major studio complex arose in the late 1990s amid concern that it was "losing some of its media city position to arch-rival Sydney and to the Gold Coast".  The strategic objectives were that construction of a major studio complex would represent Melbourne's maturity and global ambitions, develop production capacity to its next stage, and service the needs of the local film and television industry. At the time, Melbourne had a number of smaller facilities with sound stages, but did not have a large state-of-the-art complex.

History

Construction began in 2003 on a parcel of land provided by the Victorian government in the Docklands precinct. The studios were a partnership between the Victorian government and a private consortium, Central City Studio Holdings. The complex opened in April 2004 under the name Melbourne Central City Studios and that year hosted the Australian feature film production, Hating Alison Ashley. In 2005, the American-backed Ghost Rider became the first international production at the studios and, with a budget of around $120 million, was the biggest feature film ever to be made in Victoria.
However, the number of international productions in the first few years of operation did not live up to expectations, partly because of the fluctuating Australian dollar. 
In 2008 the private consortium withdrew and the Victorian government took control of the facility, later financially supporting a $10 million infrastructure upgrade. Shortly after, the complex changed its name to Docklands Studios Melbourne, formally adopting the name by which the studios were commonly known.

Recent history

In October 2019, the Victorian government unveiled plans for construction of a $46 million super stage to enable the studios to host large international productions. The 3,700m2 (40,000 ft sq) building was officially opened on March 26, 2022 and was immediately hired for production of a major feature film, Better Man.
In April 2022, it was announced that the studios would host Victoria’s biggest ever screen production, a TV series remake of Fritz Lang’s 1927 Metropolis for NBCUniversal’s Universal Studio Group. Since 2022 the CEO of the complex has been film industry executive, Antony Tulloch.

Facilities
They are hired for production of feature films, drama series and audience-based television programs as well as television commercials, music videos and corporate events.

Productions

Feature films and TV dramas
by year of release or broadcast 
Hating Alison Ashley (2005)
The Extra (2005)
Last Man Standing (Seven Network, 2005)
Charlotte's Web (2006)
Nightmares and Dreamscapes: From the Stories of Stephen King (2006)
Ghost Rider (2007)
Storm Warning (2007)
Satisfaction (2007–09)
As the Bell Rings (Disney
Where the Wild Things Are (2009)
Knowing (2009)
The Pacific (miniseries) (2010)
Tomorrow, When the War Began (2010)
Don't Be Afraid of the Dark (2010)
The Eye of the Storm (2011 - production base only)
Winners and Losers (2011–16)
Killer Elite (2011)
Jack Irish (2012/2016/2020)
Crawlspace (2012)
Patrick (2013)
INXS: Never Tear Us Apart (2014)
I, Frankenstein (2014)
Predestination (2014)
The Dressmaker (2015)
Oddball (2015)
Childhood's End (2015)
 The Menkoff Method (2016)
Restoration (2016)
Lion (2016 - production base only) 
The Legend of Ben Hall (2016)
The Leftovers (2017)
Berlin Syndrome (2017)
 Guilty (2017)
Brothers' Nest (2018) 
Winchester (2018) 
Upgrade (2018)
Bad Mothers (2019) 
 The Wheel (2019)
 Choir Girl (2019) 
  The Whistleblower (2019)
Preacher (2019)
Shantaram (2021)
Clickbait (2021)
La Brea (2021-2022)
The King's Daughter (2022)
Foe (2022)
Better Man (2022)

Audience-based and reality TV

The Rich List (Seven Network, 2007)
1 vs. 100 (Nine Network, 2007–08)
Hole in the Wall (Nine Network, 2008)
Project Runway Australia (Foxtel, 2008)
Are You Smarter Than a 5th Grader? (Network Ten, 2008–09)
Talkin' 'Bout Your Generation (Network Ten and Nine Network, 2009–12, 2018–19)
Beat the Star (Seven Network, 2010)
Iron Chef Australia (Seven Network, 2010)
Australia's Got Talent (Seven Network, 2010–12)
Ben Elton Live from Planet Earth (Nine Network, 2011)
The Million Dollar Drop (Nine Network, 2011)
Millionaire Hot Seat (Nine Network, 2011–19)
The AFL Footy Show (Nine Network, 2011–19)
Everybody Dance Now (Network Ten, 2012)
SlideShow (Seven Network, 2013)
MasterChef Australia (Network Ten, 2014) 
Q&A, Melbourne episodes (ABC TV, 2016–17)
The Big Music Quiz (Seven Network 2016)
Dancing With the Stars (Network Ten, 2020)
The Masked Singer (Australian season 2) (Network Ten, 2020)
Come Dance with Me (TV series) (CBS, 2022)

References

External links

Australian film studios
Television studios in Australia
Buildings and structures in the City of Melbourne (LGA)
2004 establishments in Australia
Buildings and structures completed in 2004